Wedginald was a 20 kilogram wheel of English cheddar cheese, made famous in 2007 when its producers broadcast its maturation process on the internet. The livestream went viral receiving national and international attention.

Wedginald was produced by Westcountry Farmhouse Cheesemakers of Westcombe Dairy, Evercreech, near Shepton Mallet, Somerset. The company set up a website, humorously titled Cheddarvision that livestreamed the cheese's maturation. The name "Wedginald" was arrived at after a naming contest on the site as a humorous portmanteau of "wedge" (as in a wedge of cheese) and the given name Reginald.

Wedginald goes viral

Initially only an internet phenomenon of limited scope, the website soon received attention from major UK media outlets such as the BBC (where Wedginald was discussed during Middlesex and Surrey county cricket broadcasts on BBC London) and national newspapers like The Times and The Independent. Wedginald also drew global attention, from newspapers as far away as Norway, and throughout the spring of 2007, featured in American media,  with regular updates on The Tony Kornheiser Radio Show. 

Over the cheese's 9 month maturation, more than 1.5 million people logged on to watch it. 

A time-lapse video on YouTube attracted several hundred thousand page views, and the cheese gained over 1,300 friends on MySpace.

Wedginald matures 
On 19 September 2007, nine months into the cheese's maturation, the first sample was taken from the wheel by Tom Calver, its creator, to determine the cheese's quality at that point. Experts stressed that this was a critical period in the maturation process, that would determine whether Wedginald would be fit for human consumption or not. 
According to Calver, at this point, Wedginald had "a caramel nose, a sweet twiggy greenness and a creamy good length of flavour...lemony, with a certain 'spritziness'".

Calver claimed that the company never expected Wedginald to go viral. He insisted that the seemingly frivolous gimmick of broadcasting Wedginald's maturation had a serious purpose: to educate the population on the art of cheesemaking and to remind consumers of the amount of effort that goes into the production of gourmet food at a time when there is increasing detachment between consumers and producers.

Wedginald's fate

Wedginald was sold in an online auction on eBay, on 19 November 2007, achieving a final sale price of £1,145 with the proceeds going to the BBC charity Children in Need. The auction attracted a total of 36 bids with nearly 200 people watching Wedginald online as the auction closed. The winner was a former resident of the Somerset village of Chew Magna, who had migrated to New Zealand as an architect, and subsequently became involved in the wine industry.

Wedginald remained online for viewing on the official website until 19 December 2007. The cheese arrived in New Zealand on 22 December 2007, and was likely subsequently eaten.

Calver is still producing cheese at the Westcombe Dairy as of 2023.

References

External links
Official website - no longer functional.

Westcombe Dairy website

Internet memes
Viral videos
English cheeses